Gary Zebrowski (born 21 July 1984) is a French snowboarder. He competed in the halfpipe at the 2006, finishing in 6th place, and 2010 Winter Olympics, finishing in 13th place. He was born in Papeete, French Polynesia.

References

External links
 
 

1984 births
Living people
People from Papeete
French male snowboarders
Olympic snowboarders of France
Snowboarders at the 2006 Winter Olympics
Snowboarders at the 2010 Winter Olympics
21st-century French people